Cheviot Lake is a lake in central Saskatchewan, Canada south-east of Saskatoon.  The lake is located in the rural municipality of Blucher No. 343. The lake is predominantly surrounded by agricultural farm land.

See also
List of lakes of Saskatchewan

References

Lakes of Saskatchewan
Blucher No. 343, Saskatchewan
Division No. 11, Saskatchewan